The Javan rhinoceros (Rhinoceros sondaicus), also known as the Javan rhino, Sunda rhinoceros or lesser one-horned rhinoceros, is a very rare member of the family Rhinocerotidae and one of five extant rhinoceroses. Only adult bulls have horns; cows lack them altogether.

Once the most widespread of Asian rhinoceroses, Javan rhinos ranged from the islands of Java and Sumatra, throughout Southeast Asia, and into India and China. The species is critically endangered, with only one known population in the wild, and no individuals in captivity. It is possibly the rarest large mammal on Earth, with a population of approximately 74 in Ujung Kulon National Park at the western tip of Java in Indonesia. The Javan rhinoceros population in Vietnam's Cat Tien National Park was declared to be locally extinct in 2011. The decline of Javan rhinos is attributed to poaching, primarily for their horns, which are highly valued in traditional Chinese medicine, fetching as much as US$30,000 per kg on the black market. As European presence in their range increased, trophy hunting also became a serious threat. Loss of habitat, especially as the result of wars, such as the Vietnam War, in Southeast Asia, has also contributed to the species' decline and hindered recovery. The remaining range is within one nationally protected area, but the rhinos are still at risk from poachers, disease, and loss of genetic diversity leading to inbreeding depression.

Javan rhinos can live around 30–45 years in the wild. They historically inhabited lowland rain forest, wet grasslands, and large floodplains. They are mostly solitary, except for courtship and offspring-rearing, though groups may occasionally congregate near wallows and salt licks. Aside from humans, adults have no predators in their range. Javan rhinos usually avoid humans. Scientists and conservationists rarely study the animals directly due to their extreme rarity and the danger of interfering with such an endangered species. Researchers rely on camera traps and fecal samples to gauge health and behavior. Consequently, Javan rhinos are the least studied of all rhino species. Two adult Javan rhinos with their calves were filmed in a motion-triggered video released on 28 February 2011 by WWF and Indonesia's National Park Authority, which proved it is still breeding in the wild. In April 2012, the National Parks Authority released video showing 35 individual Javan rhinos, including mother/offspring pairs and courting adults. There are only 58 to 68 individuals left in the wild, and none in captivity, after the death of a bull named Samson. Samson died in April 2018 at 30 years of age, far younger than the species' usual lifespan of 50 to 60 years, so DNA testing is being conducted to explore the cause of death, including the possibility of inbreeding degeneration.

Etymology 
The genus name Rhinoceros is a combination of the ancient Greek words ῥίς (ris) meaning 'nose' and κέρας (keras) meaning 'horn of an animal'. sondaicus is derived from sunda, the biogeographical region that comprises the islands of Sumatra, Java, Borneo, and surrounding smaller islands. The Javan rhino is also known as the lesser one-horned rhinoceros (in contrast with the greater one-horned rhinoceros, another name for the Indian rhino).

Taxonomy 
Rhinoceros sondaicus was the scientific name used by Anselme Gaëtan Desmarest in 1822 for a rhinoceros from Java sent by Pierre-Médard Diard and Alfred Duvaucel to the National Museum of Natural History, France. In the 19th century, several zoological specimens of hornless rhinoceros were described:
Rhinoceros inermis proposed by René Lesson in 1838 was a female rhinoceros without horns shot in the Sundarbans.
Rhinoceros nasalis and Rhinoceros floweri proposed by John Edward Gray in 1867 were two rhinoceros skulls from Borneo and one from Sumatra, respectively.
Rhinoceros annamiticus proposed by Pierre Marie Heude in 1892 was a specimen from Vietnam.

As of 2005, three Javan rhinoceros subspecies are considered valid taxa:
 R. s. sondaicus, the nominate subspecies, known as the Indonesian Javan rhinoceros
 R. s. inermis, known as the Indian Javan rhinoceros or lesser Indian rhinoceros
 R. s. annamiticus, known as the Vietnamese Javan rhinoceros or Vietnamese rhinoceros

Evolution 

Ancestral rhinoceroses are held to have first diverged from other perissodactyls in the Early Eocene. Mitochondrial DNA comparison suggests the ancestors of modern rhinos split from the ancestors of Equidae around 50 million years ago. The extant family, the Rhinocerotidae, first appeared in the Late Eocene in Eurasia, and the ancestors of the extant rhino species dispersed from Asia beginning in the Miocene.

The Indian and Javan rhinoceros, the only members of the genus Rhinoceros, first appear in the fossil record in Asia During the Early Pleistocene. The oldest known record of the species is from Early Pleistocene (~1.5 Ma) deposits at Trinil, Java. Molecular estimates suggest the two species diverged from each other much earlier, around 11.7 million years ago. Although belonging to the type genus, the Indian and Javan rhinoceroses are not believed to be closely related to other rhino species. Different studies have hypothesized that they may be closely related to the extinct Gaindatherium or Punjabitherium. A detailed cladistic analysis of the Rhinocerotidae placed Rhinoceros and the extinct Punjabitherium in a clade with Dicerorhinus, the Sumatran rhino. Other studies have suggested the Sumatran rhinoceros is more closely related to the two African species. The Sumatran rhino may have diverged from the other Asian rhinos 15 million years ago, or perhaps as far back as 25.9 million years ago (based on mitochondrial data).

Description 

Javan rhinos are smaller than the Indian rhinoceros, and are close in size to the black rhinoceros. They are the largest animal in Java and the second-largest animal in Indonesia after the Asian elephant. No substantial size difference is seen between genders, but cows may be slightly bigger. The rhinos in Vietnam appeared to be significantly smaller than those in Java, based on studies of photographic evidence and measurements of their footprints.

Like the Indian rhino, the Javan rhinos have a single horn (the other extant species have two horns). Only bulls have horns. Cows are the only extant rhinos that remain hornless into adulthood, though they may develop a tiny bump of an inch or two in height. Javan rhinos do not appear to often use their horn for fighting but instead uses it to scrape mud away in wallows, to pull down plants for eating, and to open paths through thick vegetation. Similar to the other browsing species of rhino (black and Sumatran), Javan rhinos have a long, pointed, upper lip which helps in grabbing food. Their lower incisors are long and sharp; when Javan rhinos fight, they use these teeth. Behind the incisors, two rows of six low-crowned molars are used for chewing coarse plants. Like all rhinos, Javan rhinos smell and hear well, but have very poor vision. They are estimated to live for 30 to 45 years.

Their hairless, splotchy gray or gray-brown skin falls in folds to the shoulder, back and rump. The skin has a natural mosaic pattern, which lends the rhino an armored appearance. The neck folds of Javan rhinos are smaller than those of the Indian rhinoceros, but still, form a saddle shape over the shoulder. Because of the risks of interfering with such an endangered species, however, Javan rhinos are primarily studied through fecal sampling and Camera traps. They are rarely encountered, observed or measured directly.

Distribution and habitat 

Even the most optimistic estimate suggests fewer than 100 Javan rhinos remain in the wild. They are considered one of the most endangered species in the world. The Javan rhinoceros is known to survive in only one place, the Ujung Kulon National Park on the western tip of Java.

The animal was once widespread from Assam and Bengal (where their range would have overlapped with both the Sumatran and Indian rhinos) eastward to Myanmar, Thailand, Cambodia, Laos, Vietnam, and southwards to the Malay Peninsula and the islands of Sumatra, Java, and possibly Borneo. The Javan rhino primarily inhabits dense, lowland rain forests, grasslands, and reed beds with abundant rivers, large floodplains, or wet areas with many mud wallows. Although it historically preferred low-lying areas, the subspecies in Vietnam was pushed onto much higher ground (up to 2,000 m or 6,561 ft), probably because of human encroachment and poaching.

The range of the Javan rhinoceros has been shrinking for at least 3,000 years. It likely became locally extinct in India in the first decade of the 20th century. The Javan rhino was hunted to extinction on the Malay Peninsula by 1932. The last ones on Sumatra died out during World War II. They were extinct from Chittagong and the Sunderbans by the middle of the 20th century. By the end of the Vietnam War, the Vietnamese rhinoceros was believed extinct across all of mainland Asia. Local hunters and woodcutters in Cambodia claim to have seen Javan rhinos in the Cardamom Mountains, but surveys of the area have failed to find any evidence of them. In the late 1980s, a small population was found in the Cat Tien area of Vietnam. However, the last known individual of that population was shot in 2010. A population may have existed on the island of Borneo, as well, though these specimens could have been the Sumatran rhinoceros, a small population of which still lives there.

Behavior 

The Javan rhinoceros is a solitary animal with the exception of breeding pairs and mothers with calves. They sometimes congregate in small groups at salt licks and mud wallows. Wallowing in mud is a common behavior for all rhinos; the activity allows them to maintain cool body temperatures and helps prevent disease and parasite infestation. The Javan rhinoceros does not generally dig its own mud wallows, preferring to use other animals' wallows or naturally occurring pits, which it will use its horn to enlarge. Salt licks are also very important because of the essential nutrients the rhino receives from the salt. Bull territories overlap each other less than those of the cow. It is not known if there are territorial fights.

Bull mark their territories with dung piles and by urine spraying. Scrapes made by the feet in the ground and twisted saplings also seem to be used for communication. Members of other rhino species have a peculiar habit of defecating in massive rhino dung piles and then scraping their back feet in the dung. The Sumatran and Javan rhinos, while defecating in piles, do not engage in the scraping. This adaptation in behavior is thought to be ecological; in the wet forests of Java and Sumatra, the method may not be useful for spreading odors.
The Javan rhino is much less vocal than the Sumatran; very few Javan rhino vocalizations have ever been recorded. Adults have no known predators other than humans. The species, particularly in Vietnam, is skittish and retreats into dense forests whenever humans are near. Though a valuable trait from a survival standpoint, it has made the rhinos difficult to study. Nevertheless, when humans approach too closely, the Javan rhino becomes aggressive and will attack, stabbing with the incisors of its lower jaw while thrusting upward with its head. Its comparatively antisocial behavior may be a recent adaptation to population stresses; historical evidence suggests they, like other rhinos, were once more gregarious.

Diet 
The Javan rhinoceros is herbivorous, eating diverse plant species, especially their shoots, twigs, young foliage and fallen fruit. Most of the plants favored by the species grow in sunny areas in forest clearings, shrubland and other vegetation types with no large trees. The rhino knocks down saplings to reach its food and grabs it with its prehensile upper lip. It is the most adaptable feeder of all the rhino species. Currently, it is a pure browser, but probably once both browsed and grazed in its historical range. The rhino eats an estimated  of food daily. Like the Sumatran rhino, it needs salt in its diet. The salt licks common in its historical range do not exist in Ujung Kulon but the rhinos there have been observed drinking seawater, likely for the same nutritional need.

Conservation 

The main factor in the continued decline of the Javan rhinoceros population has been poaching for horns, a problem that affects all rhino species. The horns have been a traded commodity for more than 2,000 years in China, where they are believed to have healing properties. Historically, the rhinoceros' hide was used to make armor for Chinese soldiers, and some local tribes in Vietnam believed the hide could be used to make an antidote for snake venom. Because the rhinoceros' range encompasses many areas of poverty, it has been difficult to convince local people not to kill a seemingly (otherwise) useless animal which could be sold for a large sum of money. When the Convention on International Trade in Endangered Species of Wild Fauna and Flora first went into effect in 1975, the Javan rhinoceros was listed under Appendix I meaning commercial international trade in the Javan rhinoceros and products derived from it is prohibited. Surveys of the rhinoceros horn black market have determined that Asian rhinoceros horn fetches a price as high as $30,000 per kg, three times the value of African rhinoceros horn.

Loss of habitat because of agriculture has also contributed to its decline, though this is no longer as significant a factor because the rhinoceros only lives in one nationally protected park. Deteriorating habitats have hindered the recovery of rhino populations that fell victim to poaching. Even with all the conservation efforts, the prospects for their survival are grim. Because the population is restricted to one small area, they are very susceptible to disease and inbreeding depression. Conservation geneticists estimate a population of 100 rhinos would be needed to preserve the genetic diversity of this conservation-reliant species.

Ujung Kulon 

The Ujung Kulon peninsula of Java was devastated by the eruption of Krakatoa in 1883. The Javan rhinoceros recolonized the peninsula after the event, but humans never returned in large numbers, thus creating a haven for wildlife. In 1931, as the Javan rhinoceros was on the brink of extinction in Sumatra, the government of the Dutch East Indies declared the rhino a legally protected species, which it has remained ever since. A census of the rhinos in Ujung Kulon was first conducted in 1967; only 25 animals were recorded. By 1980, that population had doubled and has remained steady, at about 50, ever since. Although the rhinos in Ujung Kulon have no natural predators, they have to compete for scarce resources with wild cattle, which may keep their numbers below the peninsula's carrying capacity. Ujung Kulon is managed by the Indonesian Ministry of Forestry. Evidence of at least four baby rhinos was discovered in 2006, the most ever documented for the species.

In March 2011, a hidden-camera video was published showing adults and juveniles, indicating recent matings and breeding. During the period from January to October 2011, the cameras had captured images of 35 rhinos. As of December 2011, a rhino breeding sanctuary in an area of 38,000 hectares is being finalized to help reach the target of 70 to 80 Javan rhinos by 2015.

In April 2012, the WWF and International Rhino Foundation added 120 video cameras to the existing 40 to better monitor rhino movements and judge the size of the animals' population. A recent survey has found far fewer cows than bulls. Only four cows among 17 rhinos were recorded in the eastern half of Ujung Kulon, which is a potential setback in efforts to save the species.

In 2012, the Asian Rhino Project was working out the best eradication programme for the arenga palm, which was blanketing the park and crowding out the rhinos' food sources. Following the trails of Javan rhinoceros allowed in-depth observation of their feeding habits in their natural habitat. Comparing the acid insoluble ash (MA) content of faeces and in the dry weight of food provided reliable estimates of digestibility, and this method has potential for wider application in situations where total collection of faecal matter is not feasible. There was a strong positive correlation between the size of home range and diversity of food intake, and between the size of home range with the numbers of wallow holes used. The quantity and quality of food intake were variable among rhinoceroses and over time. Overall energy consumption was related to the size of the animal, while the digestibility of plants consumed appeared to be influenced by individual age and habitat conditions.

In May 2017, Director of the Biodiversity Conservation at the Ministry of Environment and Forestry, Bambang Dahono Adji announced plans to transfer the rhinos to the Cikepuh Wildlife Sanctuary located in West Java. The animals will first undergo DNA tests to determine lineage and risk to disease so as to avoid issues such as "inbreeding" or marriage kinship. As of December 2018, these plans had yet to concretely materialise.

In December 2018, the remaining Javan rhino population was severely endangered by the tsunami triggered by nearby volcano Anak Krakatau.

Cat Tien 

Once widespread in Southeast Asia, the Javan rhinoceros was presumed extinct in Vietnam in the mid-1970s, at the end of the Vietnam War. The combat wrought havoc on the ecosystems of the region through the use of napalm, extensive defoliation from Agent Orange, aerial bombing, use of landmines, and overhunting by local poachers.

In 1988, the assumption of the subspecies' extinction was challenged when a hunter shot an adult cow, proving the species had somehow survived the war. In 1989, scientists surveyed Vietnam's southern forests to search for evidence of other survivors. Fresh tracks belonging to up to 15 rhinos were found along the Dong Nai River. Largely because of the rhinoceros, the region they inhabited became part of the Cat Tien National Park in 1992.

By the early 2000s, their population was feared to have declined past the point of recovery in Vietnam, with some conservationists estimating as few as three to eight rhinos, and possibly no bulls, survived. Conservationists debated whether or not the Vietnamese rhinoceros had any chance of survival, with some arguing that rhinos from Indonesia should be introduced in an attempt to save the population, with others arguing that the population could recover.

Genetic analysis of dung samples collected in Cat Tien National Park in a survey from October 2009 to March 2010 showed only a single individual Javan rhinoceros remained in the park. In early May 2010, the body of a Javan rhino was found in the park. The animal had been shot and its horn removed by poachers. In October 2011, the International Rhino Foundation confirmed the Javan rhinoceros was extinct in Vietnam, leaving only the rhinos in Ujung Kulon.

In captivity 
A Javan rhinoceros has not been exhibited in a zoo for over a century. In the 19th century, at least four rhinos were exhibited in Adelaide, Calcutta, and London. At least 22 Javan rhinos have been documented as having been kept in captivity; the true number is possibly greater, as the species was sometimes confused with the Indian rhinoceros.

The Javan rhinoceros never fared well in captivity. The oldest lived to be 20, about half the age that the rhinos can reach in the wild. No records are known of a captive rhino giving birth. The last captive Javan rhino died at the Adelaide Zoo in Australia in 1907, where the species was so little known that it had been exhibited as an Indian rhinoceros.

In culture

The Javan rhinoceros occurred in Cambodia in the past and there are at least three depictions of rhinos in the bas reliefs of the temple at Angkor Wat. The west wing of the North Gallery has a relief that shows a rhino mounted by a god thought to be the fire god Agni. The rhinos are thought to be Javan rhinoceros rather than the somewhat similar looking one-horned Indian rhino on the basis of the skinfold on the shoulder which continues along the back in the Javan to give a saddle-like appearance. A depiction of the rhino in the east wing of the South Gallery shows a rhino attacking the damned in the panel depicting heaven and hell. An architect of the temple is thought to have been an Indian Brahmin priest named Divakarapandita (1040–1120 AD) who served king Jayavarman VI, Dharanindravarman I as well as Suryavarman II who constructed the temple. It is thought that the Indian priest who died before the construction of the temple might have influenced the use of tubercles on the skin which are based on the Indian rhino while the local Khmer artisans carved the other details of the rhinos based on the more familiar local Javan rhino. The association of the rhinoceros as the vahana of the god Agni is unique to Khmer culture. Another rhinoceros carving in the centre of a circular arrangement in a column with other circles containing elephants and water buffalo is known from the temple of Ta Prohm. It has been at the centre of anachronistic speculation that it might represent a Stegosaur due to the leaves behind it that give the impression of plates.

One of the mascots of the 2018 Asian Games is a Javan rhinoceros named Kaka. 

The mascot of the 2023 FIFA U-20 World Cup is a Javan rhinoceros named Bacuya.

References

External links 

 Javan Rhino Info and Pictures on the Rhino Resource Center
 International Rhino Foundation dedicated to the conservation of rhinos: Javan Rhino
 

Rhinoceroses
Mammals of Southeast Asia
Mammals of Bangladesh
Mammals of India
Mammals of Indonesia
Mammals of Malaysia
Mammals of Vietnam
Fauna of Java
Mammals described in 1822
Conservation-reliant species
Critically endangered fauna of Asia
Extinct animals of India
Extinct animals of Vietnam
EDGE species
Critically endangered fauna of Indonesia